Verville is a French and French Canadian surname which could mean:

It can also be a variant of Vervelle, which is derived from a word that means "metal keeper" or "ring through which a bolt is secured".

Verville (Merry Point, Virginia) is listed on the National Register of Historic Places in Lancaster County, Virginia

The surname may refer to:
 Alfred V. Verville (1890–1970), an American aviation pioneer
 Alphonse Verville (1864–1921), a Canadian politician and trade unionist
 Elizabeth Verville, an American diplomat for the U.S. State Department
 François Béroalde de Verville (Paris, 1556–1626), a French Renaissance novelist, poet and intellectual
 Joseph-Achille Verville (1887–1937), a Canadian politician and Liberal Party member of the Canadian House of Commons
 Monique Roy Verville (1961–), a politician from Quebec, Canada

See also 
 Vierville (disambiguation)
 Green City (disambiguation)

References